Jane McCarry (born 2 May 1970) is a Scottish actress, teacher and acting coach. She is best known for her roles as  Isa Drennan in the BBC Scotland sitcom Still Game (2002–2007, 2016–2019), and as Granny Murray in the children's show Me Too! (2006–2007).

Career
Beginning in 2006, McCarry appeared in the children's programme, Me Too! as the middle-aged childminder, Granny Murray. Similar to the already popular Balamory, the show revolved around McCarry's character working as a nanny who educates children as to what parents may be doing during the workday.  The character of Granny Murray provides a kernel of wisdom in each episode that "saves the day" for one of the parents off at work.

McCarry also starred in Rab C Nesbitt, playing Andra's wife in the series eight episode, "Bug" and a nurse in the series 4 episode "Buckfast".

Jane worked as an actor with the Baldy Bane Theatre Co Glasgow. She appears occasionally in plays at the Edinburgh Festival Theatre.

Jane taught drama at Shawlands Academy and St Pauls High School (Pollok) for three years. She also used to teach at St Andrews RC Secondary School in Glasgow's East End as well as Sgoil Ghàidhlig Ghlaschu.

In 2012, Jane appeared in The Steamie at the King's Theatre, Glasgow.

McCarry joined the rest of the cast of the multi BAFTA Scotland award-winning Still Game in 2014 at the comeback live show at the SSE Hydro in Glasgow. There were 21 performances of the sell-out show.

In 2016, she reprised her role of Isa in the new series of Still Game, recommissioned by the BBC after the stage show's success.

Personal life
McCarry is an only child and was raised in the King's Park area of south Glasgow. She has two children (Iain and Alexander) with her ex-husband, Robert Gibson who is from nearby Rutherglen; she has stated that she based aspects of her Isa character upon observations of the town's residents going about their lives.

References

External links 
 

1970 births
Living people
20th-century Scottish actresses
21st-century Scottish actresses
Actresses from Glasgow
People educated at Kings Park Secondary School
Rutherglen
Scottish radio actresses
Scottish schoolteachers
Scottish stage actresses
Scottish television actresses